Guinea Gut is a stream in the United States Virgin Islands.

References 

Rivers of the United States Virgin Islands